The Copa Presidente de la Nación, also known as Campeonato Argentino or Copa Presidente, was an official Argentine football cup competition established by dissident body Asociación Amateurs de Football in 1920. After the AAmF dissolved, the competition continued being organised by current Argentine Football Association, although the body has not officially included this competition in its list of national cups yet.

History
Teams from Regional leagues of Argentina took part of the tournament. The champion was awarded the trophy, donated by then President of Argentina, Hipólito Yrigoyen. From 1925, the runner-up was awarded with "Copa Intendente Municipal de la Ciudad de Buenos Aires" trophy while the "Copa Comité Olímpico Argentino" trophy was given to the team placed third (from 1929). Another trophy, the "Copa Adrián Beccar Varela" (not to be confused with Copa Beccar Varela) trophy was awarded to the best team outside Buenos Aires.

Between 1942 and 1958, the champion qualified to play Copa Ibarguren facing the Primera División champion.

In the 1956-57 edition, the champion was eligible to play the "Copa Carlos Bottaro" vs. the Uruguay regional leagues champion.

By mid 1970s, the Copa Presidente de la Nación lost interest due to the addition of teams indirectly affiliated to AFA to the Primera División tournaments, with the establishment of both, Torneo Nacional in 1967 and Primera B Nacional in 1986. The Copa Presidente de la Nación last edition was held in 1988-89. Since then, only youth teams have played the tournament.

List of champions
Ref:

Titles by league

Notes

References 

P
Recurring events established in 1920
Recurring events disestablished in 1989
1920 establishments in Argentina
1989 disestablishments in Argentina